Daniel Lopez (born September 25, 1968) is an  American middle-distance runner. He competed in the men's 3000 metres steeplechase at the 1992 Summer Olympics.

References

External links
 

1968 births
Living people
Athletes (track and field) at the 1992 Summer Olympics
American male middle-distance runners
American male steeplechase runners
Olympic track and field athletes of the United States
Track and field athletes from Chicago